Laguna Redonda Airport  is an airstrip  south-southwest of Candelario Mancilla, in the O'Higgins commune, Aisén del General Carlos Ibañez del Campo Region of Chile.

The runway is in a canyon off the main channel of Lake O'Higgins, very near the border with Argentina. There is mountainous terrain in all quadrants and limited room to maneuver within the canyon.

See also

Transport in Chile
List of airports in Chile

References

External links
OpenStreetMap - Laguna Redonda
OurAirports - Laguna Redonda
FallingRain - Laguna Redonda Airport

Airports in Aysén Region